Grace Christian School or Grace Christian Academy can refer to:

United States
Grace Christian School in Anchorage, Alaska
Grace Christian School (Florida) in Valrico, Florida
Grace Christian Academy (Illinois) in Kankakee, Illinois
Grace Christian School (Michigan) in Saginaw, Michigan
Grace Christian Academy (New York) in Merrick, New York
Grace Christian School (North Carolina) in Raleigh, North Carolina
Grace Christian School in Blacklick, Ohio
Grace Christian School (Oklahoma) in Broken Arrow, Oklahoma
Grace Christian Academy (Tennessee) in Franklin, Tennessee
Grace Christian Academy (Texas) in Clear Lake City, Houston
Grace Christian Academy (Northern Mariana Islands) in Saipan, Northern Mariana Islands

Cayman Islands
Grace Christian Academy (Cayman Islands) in Grand Cayman